Ilmari Linna (27 October 1917, in Evijärvi – 6 March 1981) was a Finnish business executive and politician. He was a member of the Parliament of Finland from 1962 to 1970, representing the Social Democratic Party of Finland (SDP). He was the son of Jalmari Linna.

References

1917 births
1981 deaths
People from Evijärvi
Social Democratic Party of Finland politicians
Members of the Parliament of Finland (1962–66)
Members of the Parliament of Finland (1966–70)